"Not Too Late for Love" is the second single from Beverley Knight's fourth studio album, Affirmation. The single reached number 11 in the airplay chart and peaked at number 31 on the UK Singles Chart. At that time, it was her lowest chart position since "Sista Sista" in 1999. However this has since been eclipsed by the 2007 single, "No Man's Land" (co-written by Eg White and Jimmy Hogarth), which peaked at number 43 becoming her lowest chart position in nine years, and "After You", which charted at number 131, both of which are from Music City Soul, her 2007 album.

Video
The promo video for "Not Too Late for Love" was directed by Tim Royes and released in early September 2004. Some shots were of Beverley in a more urban city environment and the other shots were of Beverley in a golden wheat field.

Track listings
CD 1
 "Not Too Late for Love" (radio edit)
 "Remember Me"

CD 2
 "Not Too Late for Love" (radio edit)
 "Spin"
 "Sweet Thing" (Live for BBC Radio 2)
 "Not Too Late for Love" (video)

Personnel
 Written by Beverley Knight and Chris Braide
 Produced by Chris Braide
 Engineered and mixed by Mark "Tufty" Evans
 Assistant engineer: Paul Stanborough
 All vocals by Beverley Knight
 All instruments by Chris Braide
 Recorded at the Area 21, London

Charts

See also
 Beverley Knight discography

References

2004 singles
Beverley Knight songs
Songs written by Chris Braide
Songs written by Beverley Knight
Song recordings produced by Chris Braide
2004 songs
Parlophone singles